Oakham United is a football club based in  Barleythorpe, Oakham, Rutland, England. The club is a FA England Accredited Football Club affiliated to the Leicestershire and Rutland County Football Association.

History
The club was formed in 2011 as the result of a merger between Rutland Rangers and Oakham Imperial and played in the Peterborough Premier League. The 2014–15 season saw the club win the Peterborough and District Football League Premier Division title and the Presidents Premier Shield, which earned them promotion to the United Counties League Division One.

In their first season playing UCL football, Oakham finished in 12th place having earned 47 points as well as being runners up in the Leicestershire and Rutland Senior Cup, losing to Hinckley A.F.C. in the final. The club also competed in the FA Vase for the first time getting knocked out in the first qualifying round by Shirebrook Town.

The 2016–17 saw Oakham improve upon the previous season. They finished in 11th Place in the UCL Division 1 amassing 51 points and finishing in 11th place. Oakham also progressed to the 1st round of the F.A. Vase beating Gedling Miners Welfare and Retford United in the preliminary stages before being knocked out by Rocester of the Midland Football League

The 2017–18 season saw the club finish 19th in the league and so were relegated back to the Peterborough and District Football League Premier Division.

Ground
The club play their home games at Lands'End Meadow, Main Road.

Honours
Peterborough and District Football League
Premier League Champions: 2014–15
ChromaSport & Trophies President Premier Shield: 2014–15

References

External links
Official website

Football clubs in England
Football in Rutland
Oakham
Association football clubs established in 2011
2011 establishments in England
United Counties League
Peterborough and District Football League